Kill Your Friends is a 2015 British satirical black comedy crime-thriller film directed by Owen Harris and written by John Niven based on his 2008 novel of the same name. The film stars Nicholas Hoult, Craig Roberts, Tom Riley, and Georgia King. It was selected to be shown in the city to City section of the 2015 Toronto Film Festival. The film was released by StudioCanal on 6 November 2015.

Plot

London, 1997; the British music industry is on a winning streak. Britpop bands Blur, Oasis, Supergrass, and The Verve rule the airwaves and Cool Britannia is in full swing. Psychopathic twenty-seven-year-old A&R man Steven Stelfox (Nicholas Hoult) is slashing and burning his way through the music business, a world where 'no one knows anything' and where careers are made and broken by chance and the fickle tastes of the general public. Fuelled by greed, ambition and inhuman quantities of drugs, Stelfox lives the dream, as he searches for his next hit record. But as the hits dry up and the industry begins to change, Stelfox takes the concept of “killer tunes” to a murderous new level in a desperate attempt to salvage his career.

Cast

Production
On 12 February 2014, Nicholas Hoult joined the cast of the film to play lead role as (A&R) agent Steven Stelfox. On 3 March 2014, Jim Piddock joined the film's cast to play Derek Sommers, the managing director of the record label.

Filming
Principal photography commenced in London on 10 March 2014 and wrapped five weeks later. The film was shot at Pinewood Studios, London and Greater London.

Reception
The film received mixed to negative reviews from critics. On Rotten Tomatoes, the film has an approval rating of 23% based on reviews from 60 critics, with an average rating of 4.50/10. The website's critical consensus reads, "Kill Your Friends takes futile stabs at black comedy, all strangled by a glut of tonal jumbles, bad casting, and unremittingly unlikable characters." On Metacritic it has a score of 45% based on reviews from 19 critics "indicating mixed or average reviews".

Andy Webster of The New York Times called it "A richly satisfying poison-pen letter to the music industry."
Stephen Dalton of The Hollywood Reporter wrote: "Kill Your Friends remixes a brutally funny novel into an entertaining if somewhat familiar big-screen tale of amoral, chemically-fuelled decadence."

Andrew Barker of Variety wrote: "The film has its razor-sharp grace notes and a seductive stylishness, neither of which can override its relentlessly adolescent worldview."

References

External links
 

2015 films
2015 black comedy films
2015 crime thriller films
2010s comedy thriller films
2010s crime comedy films
2010s satirical films
British black comedy films
British comedy thriller films
British crime comedy films
British crime thriller films
British satirical films
Films about music and musicians
Films based on British novels
Films scored by Junkie XL
Films set in 1997
Films set in London
Films shot at Pinewood Studios
Films shot in Hampshire
Films shot in London
Films directed by Owen Harris (director)
2010s English-language films
2010s British films